Benini is an Italian surname. Notable people with the surname include:

Bull Benini (1921–2015), United States Air Force chief master sergeant
 Clarice Benini (1905–1976), Italian chess player
 Fides Benini (1929–?), Italian former swimmer
 Maurizio Benini (born 1952), Italian conductor and composer
 Paulo André Cren Benini (born 1983), Brazilian soccer player
 Rodolfo Benini (1862–1956), Italian statistician and demographer
 Sigismondo Benini (17th century), Italian painter
 Zenone Benini (1902–1976), Italian industrialist and Fascist politician

See also
Benigni (disambiguation)

Italian-language surnames